Venditti is a surname. Notable people with the surname include:

 Antonello Venditti (born 1949), Italian singer-songwriter and pianist
 Giovanbattista Venditti (born 1990), Italian rugby union player
 Robert Venditti (born 1967), American comic book writer

Italian-language surnames